The Pacific Torah Institute or PTI was an all-male Orthodox Jewish yeshiva high school in Vancouver, British Columbia, Canada.

The school was an affiliate of the Rabbinical Seminary of America or Chofetz Chaim yeshiva.   The school was the only all-male yeshiva high school in the Pacific Northwest or Western Canada.  The school was started in 2003 with 16 students in grades 8–10.

PTI was headed by three deans: Rabbi Noam Abramchik, Rabbi Aaron Kamin, and Rabbi Avi Mandel. Rabbi Shalom Meltzer and Rabbi Doniel Spector assisted the deans in their teaching. Academic studies were directed by Mr Sandy Wohl (principal) and taught by a staff of four teachers. In 2010 Rabbi Zev Davidowitz joined the PTI staff, departing in 2016, and in 2014 PTI welcomed a new Rabbi, Rabbi Doniel Spector. PTI closed down in 2019, merging Bais Medrash with the Las Vegas branch, Mesivta Las Vegas.

Founding
PTI was founded in 2003 by Rabbi David Davidowitz and Rabbi Noam Abramchik. It is the first institution of its kind in Western Canada.

Staff

Rabbis

Rabbi Noam Abramchik
A graduate of Touro College (New York) with a bachelor's degree in Business Management, Rabbi Abramchik received his Smicha Yoreh-Yoreh/Yadin-Yadin (Advanced Rabbinic Ordination) from the Rabbinical Seminary of America.  Rabbi Abramchik studied at Yeshivas Chofetz Chaim for 17 years.  He has been active in outreach and youth programming, including directing a large NCSY chapter in Queens, New York.  In September 2000, Rabbi Abramchik founded the Jewish Learning Centre in Roslyn, New York.  The JLS has become a successful educational centre for students of all ages.  Rabbi Abramchik's wife, Rivka, is a professional educator and administrator, and currently serves as Head Of School at Shalhevet, an all-girls high school in Vancouver.

Rabbi Hillel Brody
He comes to the Yeshiva from Queens New York, where he received his Semicha Yoreh-Yoreh/Yadin-Yadin (Advanced Rabbinic Ordination) from the Rabbinical Seminary of America, Yeshiva Chofetz Chaim. He spent 2 years teaching the Grade 11 honors students in Monsey at Yeshiva Zichron Yaakov, one year as the grade 10 Rebbi in Brooklyn at Yeshiva Tiferes Yisroel, and an additional 2 years teaching Jewish Law at the main Chofetz Chaim campus in Queens, New York. Rabbi Brody and his wife Devora decided the best place for this was in Richmond, British Columbia where Rabbi Brody served as the Rabbi of Young Israel of Richmond. Rabbi Brody is not the Rabbi in Richmond anymore he still teaches at PTI and is now the Rabbi for the Louis Brier home and hospital. MrMrsrody currently teaches at the Vancouver Hebrew Academy. Rabbi Brody no longer teaches at PTI and now is the head of the VTLC.

Rabbi Aaron Kamin
Most recently from Long Island, New York, received his Smicha Yoreh-Yoreh/Yadin-Yadin (Advanced Rabbinic Ordination) from the Rabbinical Seminary of America, Yeshiva Chofetz Chaim. Several of his students have followed him to Vancouver to study under his guidance in the Beis Medrash program.  Rabbi Kamin's experience includes developing outreach programs for public school children, teaching Gemara to Grade 11 in Mesivta of Forest Hills, and serving as a guest lecturer in several Synagogues in Queens and Long Island, NY.  Rabbi Kamin's wife, Rochel, is an Occupational therapist, and has her own practice, Vancouver Occupational Therapy For Kids.  They come to Vancouver with their six daughters.

Rabbi Shalom Meltzer
Received his Semicha Yoreh/Yadin-Yadin (Advanced Rabbinic Ordination) from Rabbinical Seminary of America, Yeshiva Chofetz Chaim. Concurrently, Rabbi Meltzer earned a bachelor's degree in accounting from Touro College, and sat for the CPA exam. In 2000, Rabbi Meltzer was appointed coordinator of Torah U’mesora's Hemshech Program in Queens, NY. Rabbi Meltzer has recently started working at Torah High. Rabbi Meltzer's wife, Shira, is a Speech Language Pathologist, and presently runs her own private practice.

Rabbi Zev Davidowtz
Rabbi Zev Davidowitz joined PTI in 2010 from Roslyn, New York, where he had been a Rebbi at the RSA affiliate there. He left PTI in 2016 taking his talents to the Yeshiva in Southshore.

Rabbi Doniel Spector
Rabbi Spector joined the PTI staff in 2014 after receiving Yoreh Yoreh/Yadin Yadin ordination from The Rabbinical Seminary of America in 2012. He had previously attended the Wisconsin Institute of Torah Study, and served as a teaching assistant after receiving Semicha in Queens. His wife currently serves as dean of students at Shalhevet Girls High School in Vancouver, British Columbia.

History

References

External links
 Pacific Torah Institute

Jews and Judaism in Vancouver
Orthodox yeshivas in Canada
2003 establishments in British Columbia
Educational institutions established in 2003
Jewish schools in Canada